In cryptography, SAFER (Secure And Fast Encryption Routine) is the name of a family of block ciphers designed primarily by James Massey (one of the designers of IDEA) on behalf of Cylink Corporation. The early  SAFER K and SAFER SK designs share the same encryption function, but differ in the number of rounds and the key schedule. More recent versions — SAFER+ and SAFER++ — were submitted as candidates to the AES process and the NESSIE project respectively. All of the algorithms in the SAFER family are unpatented and available for unrestricted use.

SAFER K and SAFER SK

The first SAFER cipher was SAFER K-64, published by Massey in 1993, with a 64-bit block size. The "K-64" denotes a key size of 64 bits. There was some demand for a version with a larger 128-bit key, and the following year Massey published such a variant incorporating new key schedule designed by the Singapore Ministry for Home affairs: SAFER K-128. However, both Lars Knudsen and Sean Murphy found minor weaknesses in this version, prompting a redesign of the key schedule to one suggested by Knudsen; these variants were named SAFER SK-64 and SAFER SK-128 respectively — the "SK" standing for "Strengthened Key schedule", though the RSA FAQ reports that, "one joke has it that SK really stands for 'Stop Knudsen', a wise precaution in the design of any block cipher". Another variant with a reduced key size was published, SAFER SK-40, to comply with 40-bit export restrictions.

All of these ciphers use the same round function consisting of four stages, as shown in the diagram: a key-mixing stage, a substitution layer, another key-mixing stage, and finally a diffusion layer. In the first key-mixing stage, the plaintext block is divided into eight 8-bit segments, and subkeys are added using either addition modulo 256 (denoted by a "+" in a square) or XOR (denoted by a "+" in a circle). The substitution layer consists of two S-boxes, each the inverse of each other, derived from discrete exponentiation (45x) and logarithm (log45x) functions. After a second key-mixing stage there is the diffusion layer: a novel cryptographic component termed a pseudo-Hadamard transform (PHT). (The PHT was also later used in the Twofish cipher.)

SAFER+ and SAFER++
There are two more-recent members of the SAFER family that have made changes to the main encryption routine, designed by the Armenian cryptographers Gurgen Khachatrian (American University of Armenia) and Melsik Kuregian in conjunction with Massey.

 SAFER+ (Massey et al., 1998) was submitted as a candidate for the Advanced Encryption Standard and has a block size of 128 bits. The cipher was not selected as a finalist. Bluetooth uses custom algorithms based on SAFER+ for key derivation (called E21 and E22) and authentication as message authentication codes (called E1). Encryption in Bluetooth does not use SAFER+.
 SAFER++ (Massey et al., 2000) was submitted to the NESSIE project in two versions, one with 64 bits, and the other with 128 bits.

See also
 Substitution–permutation network
 Confusion and diffusion

References
 Alex Biryukov, Christophe De Cannière, Gustaf Dellkrantz: Cryptanalysis of SAFER++. CRYPTO 2003: 195-211
 Lars R. Knudsen: A Detailed Analysis of SAFER K. J. Cryptology 13(4): 417-436 (2000)
 James L. Massey: SAFER K-64: A Byte-Oriented Block-Ciphering Algorithm. Fast Software Encryption 1993: 1-17
 James L. Massey: SAFER K-64: One Year Later. Fast Software Encryption 1994: 212-241
 James Massey, Gurgen Khachatrian, Melsik Kuregian, Nomination of SAFER+ as Candidate Algorithm for the Advanced Encryption Standard (AES)
 Massey, J. L., "Announcement of a Strengthened Key Schedule for the Cipher SAFER", September 9, 1995.
 James Massey, Gurgen Khachatrian, Melsik Kuregian, "Nomination of SAFER++ as Candidate Algorithm for the New European Schemes for Signatures, Integrity, and Encryption (NESSIE)," Presented at the First Open NESSIE Workshop, November 2000.
 Gurgen Khachatrian, Melsik Kuregian, Karen Ispiryan, James Massey, „Differential analysis of SAFER++ algorithm” – Second NESSIE workshop, Egham, UK, September 12–13, (2001)
 Lars R. Knudsen, A Key-schedule Weakness in SAFER K-64. CRYPTO 1995: 274-286.
 Lars R. Knudsen, Thomas A. Berson, "Truncated Differentials of SAFER". Fast Software Encryption 1996: 15-26
 Nomination of SAFER+ as Candidate Algorithm for the Advanced Encryption Standard (AES), Submission document from Cylink Corporation to NIST, June 1998.
 Karen Ispiryan “Some family of coordinate permutation for SAFER++” CSIT September 17–20, 2001 Yerevan, Armenia

External links
 256bit Ciphers - SAFER Reference implementation and derived code
 John Savard's description of SAFER+
 John Savard's description of SAFER K and SAFER SK
 SCAN's entry for SAFER K
 SCAN's entry for SAFER SK
 SCAN's entry for SAFER+
 SCAN's entry for SAFER++
 Announcement of new key schedule (SAFER SK)
 SAFER SK-128 in portable Common Lisp

Block ciphers